Stacey Schefflin (born March 19, 1968) is a former professional tennis player from the United States.

Biography
Schefflin, who comes from Charlotte, North Carolina, played collegiate tennis at the University of Georgia and was a member of the team which finished runner-up to Stanford in the 1987 NCAA Championships.

From 1990 to 1992 she competed on the professional tour, reaching a best ranking of 165 in the world. Most notably she made the third round of the 1991 Australian Open, beating Miriam Oremans and Tamaka Takagi en route, after winning her way through qualifying.

She represented the United States at the 1993 Maccabiah Games.

References

External links
 
 

1968 births
Living people
American female tennis players
Jewish American sportspeople
Jewish tennis players
Maccabiah Games tennis players
Georgia Lady Bulldogs tennis players
Tennis people from North Carolina
Sportspeople from Charlotte, North Carolina
21st-century American Jews
21st-century American women
Competitors at the 1993 Maccabiah Games
Maccabiah Games competitors for the United States